Nat Ross (June 13, 1902 – February 24, 1941) was an American film director and producer of the silent era. He directed more than 60 films between 1922 and 1931, and produced films until 1937. He was born in San Francisco, California. He was shot dead in Los Angeles in 1941 by a disgruntled employee whom Ross had fired from the plant where Ross was working as foreman. He was the nephew of producer Carl Laemmle.

Partial filmography

 Ridin' Wild (1922)
 The Galloping Kid (1922)
 The Ghost Patrol (1923)
 Pure Grit (1923)
 The Six-Fifty (1923)
 The Slanderers (1924)
 Striving for Fortune (1926)
 April Fool (1926)
 Two Can Play (1926)
 Transcontinental Limited (1926)
 Stop That Man! (1928)
 College Love (1929)
 Darby and Joan (1937)

External links

1902 births
1941 deaths
American murder victims
Film producers from California
People murdered in Los Angeles
Businesspeople from San Francisco
Deaths by firearm in California
20th-century American businesspeople
Film directors from San Francisco
 1941 murders in the United States